Carl Anthony Jackson MVO (born 1958) is a British organist and the Director of Music at the Chapel Royal, Hampton Court.

Carl Jackson grew up in Harrow. His father worked as an air traffic engineer at London Heathrow Airport, then at London Air Traffic Control Centre.   His mother, originally from Saint Ann's Bay (Jamaica), was a magistrate and nursing education tutor.  He attended Harrow County School for Boys between 1970 and 1977, which he combined with studies as a Junior Exhibitioner at the Royal Academy of Music. After a gap-year at the Academy, he then read music at Downing College, Cambridge where he served as organ scholar between 1978 and 1981.   His teachers included Malcolm Hill, Alan Harverson and Peter Hurford. After graduating in music from Cambridge, he moved on to Goldsmiths' College where he obtained a teaching qualification. From 1986 to 1990 he was organist and Director of Music at Croydon Parish Church (now Croydon Minster). He took over as Director of Music at the Chapel Royal, Hampton Court in 1996, following the death of Gordon Reynolds the previous year.

References

1958 births
English people of Jamaican descent
British classical organists
British male organists
Cathedral organists
English choral conductors
British male conductors (music)
Members of the Royal Victorian Order
People educated at Harrow High School
Alumni of Downing College, Cambridge
Alumni of Goldsmiths, University of London
Living people
21st-century British conductors (music)
21st-century organists
21st-century British male musicians
Male classical organists